Anchor Corner is a village in Norfolk, England.

Villages in Norfolk
Breckland District